Two-stage presidential elections were held in Finland in 1962. On 15 and 16 January the public elected presidential electors to an electoral college. They in turn elected the President. The result was a victory for Urho Kekkonen, who won on the first ballot. The turnout for the popular vote was 81.5%.

Background
Since Kekkonen's extremely narrow victory in the 1956 Finnish presidential elections, his political opponents had planned to defeat him in the election of 1962.

In the spring of 1961, the Social Democrats, National Coalition Party, Swedish People's Party, People's Party, Small Farmers' Party and the Liberal League nominated former Chancellor of Justice Olavi Honka as their presidential candidate.

The Honka League's goal was to receive a majority of the 300 presidential electors, and thus defeat President Kekkonen.

At the end of October 1961, the Soviet government sent a diplomatic note to the Finnish Government, claiming that neo-fascism and militarism were growing so much in West Germany that Finland and the Soviet Union were in danger of being attacked by that country or by some other NATO member states.

Thus the Soviet Union asked Finland to negotiate on possible joint military co-operation under the Finno-Soviet Treaty articles.

The Note Crisis alarmed many Finnish people, politicians and ordinary voters alike.  In late November 1961, Honka dropped his presidential candidacy.  Kekkonen then travelled to the Soviet Union where the Soviet leader, Nikita Khrushchev, briefly negotiated with him and assured the audience in Novosibirsk that Finland and the Soviet Union continued to have good relations, although some Finns tried to worsen them, and that joint military exercises were not needed, after all.

Following the Note Crisis, Kekkonen's popularity soared, as many Finnish voters believed him to be more capable than his opponents of defending Finland's neutrality and security. Kekkonen was easily re-elected President

Results

Popular vote

Electoral college

References

1962
Presidential election
Finnish presidential election